Arlington High School is a public high school in Riverside, California, United States.

History
Founded in 1973, Arlington is one of 5 comprehensive high schools in Riverside Unified School District. The first graduating class at Arlington was the Class of 1975.

Sports
Football – 1973 (with no seniors on the team) won 1st round CIF playoff game vs Big Bear

State championships
Baseball – 1999

CIF Southern Section champion
Baseball – 1999, 2002, 2004
Football – 1981, 1990, 2021 
Water Polo – 1998
Girls Water Polo – 2006, 2010
Girls Tennis – 2008, 2009
Boys Tennis – 2010, 2011, 2012
Boys Soccer — 2019

CIF Southern Section Divisional Place Winners
Boys Swimming
BUTTERFLY – 100 YARDS
1979 1st place 2-A Tom Hobbs, Arlington 52.46
 Bob Merrill 1st place 100 meter sprint 49.9876 state record*
Girls Swimming
FREESTYLE – 50 YARDS
1983 1st place 3-A Heidi Planter, Arlington 24.22
BUTTERFLY – 100 YARDS
1985 1st place 3-A Marla Bessegger, Arlington 57.23
BREASTSTROKE – 100 YARDS
1983 1st place 3-A Heidi Planter, Arlington 1:07.12

Boys Track and Field 
HIGH JUMP
1980 1st place 3-A Chris Harper, Arlington 6-08
LONG JUMP
1980 1st place 3-A Chris Harper, Arlington 24-03.50

Girls Track and Field 
SHOT PUT
1984 1st place 2-A Pam Alexander, Arlington 44-04.25

Boys Wrestling
1981 Steve Bottini 3rd place 135
1982 Sonny Ciprion 3rd place 103
1985 Ron Main 4th place 185
1993 Jason Tupper 1st place 119
1996 Brandon Quaid 5th Place 160
1999 Mike Werner 6th place 275
1999 Russell Clark 4th place 160
2000 Richard Ybarra 6th place 103
2000 Mike Werner 2nd place 275
2000 Allan Gutscher 1st place 135
2001 Allan Gutscher 6th place 135
2002 Allan Gutscher 4th place 135
2003 Jon Castillo 3rd place 189
2004 Chris Luna 6th place 215
2006 Brandon Helm 1st place 135
2007 Alex Suarez 4th place 275
2007 Brandon Helm 1st place 140
2008 David Skane 1st Place 189
2008 Phillip Tobin 1st place 215 "Upper Weight Most Valuable Wrestler"
2009 Jacob Rock 6th place 171
2011 Billy Cezeski 5th place 152
2011 Michael Nicolas 2nd place 103
2012 Darin Pazmino 2nd place 160
2012 Ryon Schafer 5th place 120
2012 Michael Behnke 3rd place 138
2013 Miko Flores 3rd place 115
2014 Alan Inzunza 6th place 195
2015 Victor Jacinto 4th place 106
2015 Jesus Macias 4th place 285
2016 Victor Jacinto 4th place 106
2017 Alex Elias 2nd place 220
2017 Fernando Felix 7th place 160
2019 Artie Carranza 1st place 106
2019 Robert Blanco 6th place 145
2020 Artie Carranza 1st place 106
2020 Deshawn Mercadel 2nd place 170
2020 Isaac Valencia 4th place 132
2022 Artie Carranza 1st place 113

Girls Wrestling
2010 Erin Leach 2nd Place 103
2011 Larissa Chavez 5th place 126
2022 Regina Awana 3rd place 121

CIF Southern Section Masters Place Winners
Boys Wrestling
1985 – Ron Main 5th place 185
1999 – Mike Werner 6th place 275
2000 – Mike Werner 4th place 275
2012 – Michael Behnke 6th place 138
2020 Artie Carranza 9th place 106
2022 Artie Carranza 2nd place 113

CIF State Place Winners
Girls Track and Field
SHOT PUT
1984 1st place Pam Alexander, Arlington 44-04.25

Girls Wrestling
2010 Erin Leach 5th place 103

Activities

Mock Trial
Arlington students won the National High School Mock Trial Championship in 1994.

Envirothon champions
 Envirothon: 2003, 2004, 2005, 2009, 2010, 2012, 2013

Air Force Junior Reserve Officer Training Corps
Award-winning corps of cadets learning Integrity, Service, and Excellence from retired Air Force personnel.

Choir Program
Arlington High School has a renowned choral program and is currently conducted by Ray Medina. Previous conductors include Kelli Dower and Tim Lutz. There are 5 different choirs at Arlington:  Men's Choir, Beginning Women's Choir, Advanced Women's Choir, The Mane Attraction (Show Choir), and the Chamber Singers. The premiere ensemble is the Chamber Singers. The Chamber Singers have a rich history and are extremely active within the community, which includes participation in the annual Disneyland Candlelight Procession & Ceremony. They have participated every year since 1985. In 2014 they were invited to perform at Carnegie Hall in New York and performed there the summer of 2015.

ACDA National Honor Choir Members
 Bradford Stephens Tenor II - 2009
 Christian Koshay Tenor I - 2009
 Josue Jurado Bass II - 2009

Golden Pride Marching Band and Color Guard

https://m.facebook.com/ahsgoldenpride

The Arlington High School Color Guard made Winter Guard International Class A Finals in 1992. The guard qualified for Open Class Finals in 1994 but got a timing penalty which moved Clayton Valley High School into Finals.

Notable alumni
 Lucas Duda, professional baseball player in MLB, plays for the New York Mets
William "Bill" Murphy, professional baseball player.

References

External links
 California Department of Education: Dataquest reports
 Arlington High School

High schools in Riverside, California
Public high schools in California
1973 establishments in California